Gerard Powys Dewhurst  J.P. (14 February 1872 – 29 March 1956; sometimes referred to as Gerald Powys Dewhurst) was an English cotton merchant and banker. He was also an amateur footballer, and earned one international cap for England in 1895, playing as an inside forward.

Early and personal life
Born in London, he was the son of George Bakewell Dewhurst and Frances Ada Dewhurst (née Mann). He grew up at Oughtrington Hall in Lymm, Cheshire, and was educated at Repton School, where he was a member of the school football XI in 1889 and 1890, and Trinity College, Cambridge. While at Cambridge, he earned a "blue" in 1892, 1893 and 1894.

In 1897 he married Mary Brougham, by whom he had two sons.

Football career
Dewhurst played for Liverpool Ramblers and the Corinthians as an amateur, and also played one game for Liverpool against Crewe Alexandra on 24 March 1894. He made 32 appearances for the Corinthians between 1892 and 1895, scoring 18 goals.

He earned one cap for England in a British Home Championship against Wales on 18 March 1895, whilst registered as a Liverpool Ramblers player. All eleven England players were members of the Corinthian club and were expected to produce an easy victory; in the event, Wales proved stronger than expected and the match ended in a 1–1 draw with Rupert Sandilands equalizing shortly after Wales took the lead through Billy Lewis.

Business career
Dewhurst joined his family cotton trading firm, Geo. & R. Dewhurst Ltd. of Manchester, becoming Chairman and Managing Director. He was also Chairman of the Vulcan Insurance Company of Manchester, a director of the London Assurance Corporation and a member of the Manchester Royal Exchange. He later worked as a banker with Williams Deacon's Bank, becoming Chairman, and as a director of The Royal Bank of Scotland.

He served as Justice of the Peace for Denbighshire.

The Great Central Railway named one of its GCR Class 11F "Improved Director" steam locomotives after him, No. 507 (later L.N.E.R. No. 5507 and B.R. No. 62661).

References

External links

1872 births
People from Mayfair
Footballers from the City of Westminster
1956 deaths
People educated at Repton School
Alumni of Trinity College, Cambridge
English bankers
English businesspeople
English footballers
England international footballers
Liverpool Ramblers F.C. players
Corinthian F.C. players
Liverpool F.C. players
People from Lymm
Association football forwards